Kankakee Valley School Corporation is a school district in Indiana, headquartered in Wheatfield Township, near Wheatfield.

Schools
Secondary schools:
 Kankakee Valley High School (Wheatfield Township)
 Kankakee Valley Middle School (Wheatfield Township)
Primary schools:
 Kankakee Valley Intermediate School (Wheatfield Township)
 DeMotte Elementary School (DeMotte)
 Wheatfield Elementary School (Wheatfield)

References

External links

Kankakee Valley School Corporation

School districts in Indiana
Education in Jasper County, Indiana